Miss Mundo Dominicana 2011 was held September 20, 2011, in Renaissance Auditorio de Festival del Hotel Jaragua, Santo Domingo. The Miss Mundo Dominicana winner represented the Dominican Republic in Miss World 2011, the Miss RD Internacional entered Miss International 2011, Miss Supranational RD entered Miss Supranational 2012, and the Miss Tourism Queen RD entered Miss Tourism Queen International 2011. The first runner up entered the Reinado Internacional del Café 2012. The winner was crowned by Sofinel Báez, Miss International Dominicana 2010.

Results

Tie between Miss Valverde and Miss Espaillat, making the Top 10 to Top 11

Regional Queens

Fast Track Awards
 Top Model* - Lincy Valautta (La Altagracia)
 Sport Miss* - Bianca Hazim (Peravia)
 Best Talent* - Milagros de Moya (Santiago)
 Beauty with a Purpose* - Licelote Ortíz (Puerto Plata)
 Beach Beauty* - Saly Aponte (Hermanas Mirabal)
 *Awarded and Placed in the Semifinals.

Special Awards
 Miss Photogenic - Sally Aponte (Hermanas Mirabal)
 Miss Congeniality  - Bianca Hazim (Peravia)
 Best Face - Carola Duran (La Vega)
 Best National Costume - Sally Aponte (Hermanas Mirabal)

Contestants

Crossovers 
Contestants who previously competed at other beauty pageants or were expected to:

Miss Dominican Republic 2011
 Azua: Ángela Gutiérrez Cáceres
 Hato Mayor: Dania Ventura de los Santos
 Hermanas Mirabal: Saly Lucía Aponte Tejada
Miss Dominican Republic 2010
 Espaillat: Catherine Ramírez Rosario (as Miss Santiago)
 El Seibo: Elba Pujols
 Valverde: Luz Rosario Almonte (as Miss La Vega)
Reina Nacional de Belleza Miss República Dominicana 2007
 Espaillat: Catherine Ramírez Rosario (as Miss La Vega)
Reina Nacional de Belleza Miss República Dominicana 2008
 Santo Domingo Norte: Leslie Domínguez Lavos (as Miss San Pedro de Macorís)
Miss Tierra República Dominicana 2009
 La Romana: Rosa Clarissa Ortíz Melo
Miss Turismo Dominicana 2009
 El Seibo: Elba Pujols (as Miss Barahona)
Miss Turismo Dominicana 2011
 Peravia: Bianca Hazim Madera
 Santo Domingo: Nilcalys Nunez (as Miss Independencia)

References

External links
Official website

Beauty pageants in the Dominican Republic
Dominican Republic